Saman Pakbaz (born 19 July 1995) is a paralympic athlete from Iran competing in category F11-12 shot put event.

Pakbaz competed in the 2016 Summer Paralympics shot put and won the silver medal in the F11-12 shot put.

References

Paralympic athletes of Iran
Athletes (track and field) at the 2016 Summer Paralympics
Paralympic silver medalists for Iran
Living people
1995 births
Medalists at the 2016 Summer Paralympics
Iranian male shot putters
Paralympic medalists in athletics (track and field)
Athletes (track and field) at the 2020 Summer Paralympics
Iranian male discus throwers
21st-century Iranian people
Visually impaired shot putters
Visually impaired discus throwers
Paralympic shot putters
Paralympic discus throwers
Medalists at the 2018 Asian Para Games
World Para Athletics Championships winners
Medalists at the World Para Athletics Championships